The Eggishorn is a mountain in the southeastern part of the Bernese Alps, located north of Fiesch in the Swiss canton of Valais. A cable car station is located on a secondary summit named Fiescherhorli (2,893 m), 500 metres south of the main peak.

The Eggishorn lies within the Jungfrau-Aletsch-Bietschhorn region, which in 2001 was designated by UNESCO as a World Heritage Site. On its northern flank is the Aletsch Glacier. From the summit the view extends also to the Lepontine and Pennine Alps (Dom, Matterhorn, Weisshorn).

Together with Fiescherhorli and Bettmerhorn, Eggishorn forms a ridge, running in a direction from north-northeast to south-southwest, with steep slopes on both sides, facing Aletsch Glacier in the west and the mountain plateau of Fiescheralpe above the Rhone valley in the 
east. In terms of its geology, this mountain ridge is part of the metamorphic coat of the granitic Aarmassif; predominant rock types are gneiss and schist.

Pictures

See also
List of mountains of Switzerland accessible by public transport

References

External links 

Eggishorn on Summitpost
Eggishorn on Hikr
Eggishorn, the mountain of views
Fiesch Eggishorn cable car (FE)

Bernese Alps
Mountains of the Alps
Mountains of Valais
Cable cars in Switzerland
Mountains of Switzerland
Two-thousanders of Switzerland